Luděk Bukač (4 August 1935 – 20 April 2019) was a Czech ice hockey player and manager. As a player, he played for ČLTK Praha, HC Sparta Praha and HC Dukla Jihlava, while as a manager, he coached HC Sparta Praha, HC Košice and HC České Budějovice. As a manager, he coached the Czechoslovak, Austrian, German and Czech national teams. With the Czech Republic, he won the 1996 IIHF World Championship.

Bukač died on 20 April 2019, aged 83.

References

External links

1935 births
2019 deaths
Czech ice hockey coaches
Czech Republic men's national ice hockey team coaches
Czechoslovak ice hockey coaches
Czechoslovak ice hockey centres
Czechoslovakia men's national ice hockey team coaches
Germany men's national ice hockey team coaches
HC Dukla Jihlava players
HC Sparta Praha players
Sportspeople from Ústí nad Labem
IIHF Hall of Fame inductees
Austria men's national ice hockey team coaches
Czech expatriate ice hockey people
Czechoslovak expatriate ice hockey people
Czechoslovak expatriate sportspeople in Austria
Czechoslovak expatriate sportspeople in Germany
Poland men's national ice hockey team coaches
Czech expatriate sportspeople in Germany
Czech expatriate sportspeople in Poland